is a Japanese voice actor from Tokyo, Japan. Most but not all of his roles are minions or ruffians.

Biography

Filmography

Anime
 Autolauncher and Bighorn (Beast Wars II)
 Hardhead (Beast Wars Neo)
 Birdy (Bomberman Jetters)
 Build Cyclone and Wrecker Hook (Car Robot)
 Koji Kuroki, Cerberus, Kaoru Hatsujo, Morgan, and other misc. in (Eyeshield 21)
 Roland/Isono (Yu-Gi-Oh!)
 Akazawa Yoshiro (Prince of Tennis)
 Alfonso (Gunslinger Girl)
 Drake Anderson (R.O.D. the TV)
 Hiyoshi Wakashi (Prince of Tennis)
 Genba, Bat (Ginga Densetsu Weed)
 Baku's Mother (Onegai My Melody)
 Sawada Iemitsu (Katekyo Hitman Reborn)
 Lotten (Yu-Gi-Oh! 5D's)
 Jikochu, Proto Jikochu (DokiDoki! PreCure)
 Norway (Axis Powers: Hetalia)
 Chūshō Sa and Big Boss (Saiunkoku Monogatari)
 Dr. Immanuel Klipse (Monsuno)
 Gaidora (Transformers Go!)
 Hachibururn (ep 3), Aribomer (ep 6), Semitobun (ep 9) (Time Bokan 24)
 Dick Gumshoe (Ace Attorney)
 ZZ (JoJo's Bizarre Adventure: Stardust Crusaders)
Lodin Haijima (Beyblade Burst GT)
Yokumiru Mera (ep 53 to 57, ep 59 and 60) (My Hero Academia, season 3), (ep 78 to 80) (My Hero Academia, season 4), (ep 132 and 133) My Hero Academia, season 6
Mr. Hat (Welcome to Demon School! Iruma-kun, season 3)

Tokusatsu
 Barukibaruki (ep 30), Bazoogas (ep 39) (Seijuu Sentai Gingaman)
 Sadondas β (Kamen Rider Fourze)
 Advanced Youkai Nue (ep 19 and 20) (Shuriken Sentai Ninninger)
 Hanayaida (ep 9) (Doubutsu Sentai Zyuohger)

Video games
 Ryuji Goda (Yakuza 2, Yakuza: Dead Souls and Yakuza Kiwami 2)
 Roy "Big Bo" Boateng (Binary Domain)
 Saigō Takamori (Like a Dragon: Ishin!)
 Goldion (Disgaea 5)
 Raoh (Fist of the North Star: Lost Paradise)

Drama CDs
 Ousama na Neko (Alpha & Atsuo Nabeshima)

Dubbing
The French Dispatch (Roebuck Wright (Jeffrey Wright), Paul Duval (Christoph Waltz))

References

External links
 
 Masami Iwasaki at GamePlaza Haruka Voice Acting Database 

1971 births
Living people
Japanese male video game actors
Japanese male voice actors
Male voice actors from Tokyo
20th-century Japanese male actors
21st-century Japanese male actors